Hoseynabad-e Harandi (also Romanized as Ḩoseynābād-e Harandī, Hosein Abad Harandi, and Ḩoseynābād Harandī) is a village in Hoseynabad Rural District, Esmaili District, Anbarabad County, Kerman Province, Iran. At the 2006 census, its population was 302, in 55 families.

References 

Populated places in Anbarabad County